is a Japanese former competitive figure skater. She is the 2010 NRW Trophy champion, 2011 Ondrej Nepela Memorial silver medalist, and 2008 Japanese junior bronze medalist.

Programs

Competitive highlights 
GP: Grand Prix; JGP: Junior Grand Prix

References

External links 

 

1990 births
Japanese female single skaters
Sportspeople from Tokyo
Living people
Competitors at the 2011 Winter Universiade